This is a summary of 1960 in music in the United Kingdom, including the official charts from that year.

Summary
A major event of the year was the West End premiere of Lionel Bart's musical Oliver!, an immediate success which made stars of Ron Moody and Georgia Brown.

Events
29 March – The 5th Eurovision Song Contest, held at the Royal Festival Hall, London, is won by France with the song "Tom Pillibi", sung by Jacqueline Boyer.
15 March – Jussi Björling suffers a heart attack before a performance at the Royal Opera House, Covent Garden.  He goes on to perform, but dies six months later in Sweden.
April – Jack Good's new TV show, Wham!, is broadcast for the first time.
12 April – Sir Thomas Beecham returns to the UK from his last overseas conducting tour; he dies the following year.
17 April – Eddie Cochran, Gene Vincent and Cochran's girlfriend Sharon Sheeley are injured in a car accident near Chippenham, Wiltshire. Cochran dies in a hospital in Bath, Somerset, from severe brain injuries.
20–28 May – The Beatles, as the Silver Beetles (uncredited), play their first ever tour, as a backing group for Johnny Gentle on a tour of Scotland. The lineup comprises John Lennon, Paul McCartney, George Harrison, Stuart Sutcliffe and Tommy Moore.
June – Tommy Steele marries former Windmill girl Ann Donoghue at St. Patrick's Church, Soho Square, London.
30 June – Opening of Lionel Bart's musical Oliver! at the New Theatre in London's West End.
July – The Shadows' instrumental Apache is released.
30 July – "Battle of Beaulieu": At a jazz festival at Beaulieu, Hampshire, fans of trad jazz come to blows with progressives.
1 August – The Beatles make their first appearance under this name in Hamburg, Germany. The band at this time comprises John Lennon, Paul McCartney, George Harrison, Stu Sutcliffe on bass and Pete Best on drums.
August – Colin Davis makes his conducting début at the Proms in a programme of Britten, Schumann, Mozart and Berlioz.
21 September – Mstislav Rostropovich gives the UK premiere of Dmitri Shostakovich's First Cello Concerto at the Royal Festival Hall, London. Benjamin Britten attends, and from their meeting they become firm friends, resulting in Britten composing several major works for the cellist. 
December 
Adam Faith becomes the first pop star to be interviewed on the BBC's Face to Face.
George Formby makes his final television appearance, on BBC's The Friday Show.
Ian Lake launches the Music of our Time Festival in London for hitherto unknown composers.

The Official UK Singles Chart
See also List of UK top 10 singles in 1960

Number one singles
See UK No.1 Hits of 1960

Albums
101 Strings – Down Drury Lane to Memory Lane
Adam Faith – Adam
Billy Fury – The Sound of Fury
Mantovani – The Music of Victor Herbert and Sigmund Romberg
Anthony Newley – Love is a Now and Then Thing
Cliff Richard and The Shadows – Me and My Shadows
George Shearing – The Shearing Touch
David Whitfield –  My Heart and I
Marty Wilde – Versatile Mr Wilde

Classical music: new works
William Alwyn – Piano Concerto No. 2
Malcolm Arnold – Symphony No. 4
Alun Hoddinott – Piano Concerto No. 2
Michael Tippett – Music (words P.B. Shelley)
William Walton – Symphony No. 2
David Wynne – Ebb and Flow

Opera
Benjamin Britten – A Midsummer Night's Dream
Arwel Hughes – Serch yw’r Doctor

Film and Incidental music
John Addison – The Entertainer (film version).
Malcolm Arnold – The Pure Hell of St Trinian's.
John Dankworth – Saturday Night and Sunday Morning, starring Albert Finney.
Brian Easdale – Peeping Tom directed by Michael Powell.
Ron Goodwin – 
The Trials of Oscar Wilde, starring Peter Finch and Lionel Jeffries.
Village of the Damned, starring George Sanders.
Elisabeth Lutyens – Never Take Sweets from a Stranger.
Malcolm Williamson – The Brides of Dracula directed by Terence Fisher, starring Peter Cushing.

Musical theatre
Lionel Bart – Oliver!
Julian Slade & Dorothy Reynolds – Follow That Girl

Musical films
Jazz Boat, starring Anthony Newley

Births
 3 February – Malcolm Martineau, pianist
 4 February – Tim Booth, singer, dancer and actor (James)
 11 February – Momus, born Nicholas Currie, songwriter
 19 February – Holly Johnson, singer (Frankie Goes to Hollywood)
 4 April – Jane Eaglen, dramatic soprano
 23 April
 Steve Clark, rock guitarist (died 1991)
 Barry Douglas, classical pianist
 26 April – Roger Taylor, drummer (Duran Duran)
 29 April – Phil King, bassist
 19 May – Yazz, born Yasmin Evans, pop singer
 24 May – Guy Fletcher, keyboardist (Dire Straits)
 1 June – Simon Gallup, bassist (The Cure)
 2 June – Tony Hadley, singer (Spandau Ballet)
 8 June – Mick Hucknall, singer and songwriter (Simply Red)
 10 June – Mark-Anthony Turnage, composer
 19 June – Luke Morley, guitarist, songwriter and producer (The Union, Terraplane and Thunder)
 20 June – John Taylor, bass guitarist (Duran Duran)
 3 July – Vince Clarke, songwriter (Depeche Mode, Yazoo and Erasure)
 19 July – Kevin Haskins, English-American drummer and songwriter (Bauhaus, Love and Rockets and Tones on Tail)
 14 August – Sarah Brightman, soprano singer and actress
 8 September – David Steele, bassist (Fine Young Cannibals)
 2 October – Django Bates, composer, multi-instrumentalist and band leader
 5 October - Paul Heard, keyboardist (M People)
 6 October – Richard Jobson, rock singer-songwriter (Skids), filmmaker and television presenter
 18 November – Kim Wilde, singer
 2 December – Rick Savage, bassist (Def Leppard)
 22 December – Mark Brydon, guitarist, songwriter, and producer

Deaths
2 January – Leila Megane, operatic mezzo-soprano, 68
25 January – Rutland Boughton, composer, 82
27 March – Ian Whyte, conductor, 58
7 May – Mai Jones, songwriter, 61
12 May – Cecil Armstrong Gibbs, composer, 70
26 August – Mark Hambourg, pianist, 81
20 October – Denise Orme, music hall singer, 75
24 December – Beryl Ingham, clog-dancer and actress, wife of George Formby, 59 (leukaemia)

See also
 1960 in British radio
 1960 in British television
 1960 in the United Kingdom
 List of British films of 1960

References

 
British Music, 1960 In
British music by year